, was a central banker in the Empire of Japan, serving as the 15th Governor of the Bank of Japan and twice as a cabinet minister.

Biography 
Yūki was born in the onsen resort of Akayu in what is now part of Nan'yō, Yamagata Prefecture, where his father was a sake brewer. After graduating from Tokyo Imperial University with a degree in political science, he obtained a position at the Bank of Japan from January 1904. Yūki was promoted rapidly, serving as auditor in the bank's New York City branch, branch manager in Kyoto, Corporate Secretary, and branch manager in Osaka. In 1918, at the recommendation of Junnosuke Inoue, Yūki was appointed to the Board of Directors, while still maintaining his post as Osaka branch manager.
However, following the assassination of Yasuda Zenjirō, Yūki left the Bank of Japan to join the Board of Directors for the Yasuda zaibatsu in November 1921, and was appointed Managing Director of Yasuda Bank the same year.

As head of Yasuda Bank, Yūki was a member of a committee which drafted "Definite Policies for the Improvement of the Ordinary Banking System in Our Country in 1926. The report identified a range of significant issues:
Ordinary banks in our country have frequently conducted their business badly.  There has been excessive competition among too many small banks with slender means; bankers have been ignorant of the need for reserves to back deposit withdrawals and generally ill-informed about the working of deposit banking; there has been over enthusiastic lending of bank resources in either particular or long-term outlets against securities of real estates in favour of related businesses; there has been serious negligence in establishing a thorough audit system both inside and outside the banks.

The need to address the problems identified in this proposal generally acknowledged.  The report was the genesis of a process which led to the Bank Act of 1927.

In March 1929, Yūki left for a tour of Europe. On his return, he established a committee to find was for the Yasuda zaibatsu to weather the Great Depression.
From September 1930, Yūki was head of the Industrial Bank of Japan.
Yūki was subsequently elected head of the Japan Chamber of Commerce and Industry in January 1937. In February 1937, he was appointed Minister of Finance in the Hayashi administration, serving to June 1937.  The concurrently also held the portfolio of Minister of Colonial Affairs for the same period. From May 1937, Yūki was also appointed to a seat in the Upper House of the Diet of Japan.

During the 1st Konoe administration, July 27, 1937 on Yūki returned to the Bank of Japan as governor, replacing Shigeaki Ikeda. He held the post until March 18, 1944.
During Yūki's tenure, the bank was reorganized in 1942. However, Yūki was removed from his office by the Finance Minister with the support of the Tōjō cabinet in 1944.  Yuki had opposed giving the Munitions Minister the authority to approve loans to munitions companies without consultation with the bank, and Tōjō was both Prime Minister and Munitions Minister at the time
Following World War II, Yūki retired from public life, and moved to Mie Prefecture, where he became the chief kannushi of the Yuki Jinja Shinto shrine. He died in 1951, and his grave is at the Aoyama Cemetery in Tokyo.

In 1995, the town of Akayu opened a memorial museum in his honor.

 References 
 Fuji Ginkō. (1967). Banking in modern Japan. Tokyo: Fuji Bank, Research Division. OCLC 1050668
 Henning, C. Randall. (1994). Currencies and Politics in the United States, Germany, and Japan.  Washington, DC : Institute for International Economics. ;  OCLC 28890661
 Nussbaum, Louis-Frédéric and Käthe Roth. (2005).  Japan encyclopedia. Cambridge: Harvard University Press. ;  OCLC 58053128
 Tamaki, Norio. (1995). Japanese banking: a History, 1859–1959.'' Cambridge: Cambridge University Press. ;  OCLC 231677071

Notes

External links
 

|-

1877 births
1951 deaths
Ministers of Finance of Japan
Government ministers of Japan
Governors of the Bank of Japan
Japanese bankers
Kannushi
Members of the House of Peers (Japan)
People from Yamagata Prefecture
University of Tokyo alumni